Takeo Kawamura may refer to:

Takeo Kawamura (politician)
Takeo Kawamura (baseball)